Deers is an unincorporated community in Champaign County, Illinois, United States. There are only two houses in Deers. There is a sign on a utility pole "Deers Pop. - Few".  The grain elevator has been razed.  Deers was formerly served by Norfolk and Western Railway, but that branch line was removed in 1991. Deers is southeast of Urbana.

A post office was established at Deers in 1887, and remained in operation until 1913. The community's name honors Thomas Deer, a local pioneer.

Deers elevator (Section 6, Sidney Township) was built along the Wabash—Norfolk Southern railroad spur running between Urbana and Sidney 1881−1990, and was operated by Dryer and Burt Grain and Coal in 1913. The elevator and the Deers Station depot post office at the southeast intersection of county roads 1200N and 1800E, were demolished. The railroad spur and adjacent siding were abandoned and the tracks taken up in 1991.

References

Unincorporated communities in Champaign County, Illinois
Unincorporated communities in Illinois